Gazi Mohammad Shahnawaz, also known as Milad Gazi, is a Bangladesh Awami League politician and the incumbent Member of Parliament of Habiganj-1.

Early life
Shahnawaz was born on 17 July 1958. He has a BCom degree.

Career
Shahnawaz was elected to parliament from Habiganj-1 as a Bangladesh Awami League candidate 30 December 2018.

References

Awami League politicians
Living people
10th Jatiya Sangsad members
11th Jatiya Sangsad members
People from Nabiganj Upazila
1958 births